Ernest Cahen (18 August 1828, Paris – 8 November 1893, Paris) was a 19th-century French pianist, organist, music teacher and composer.

Life 
After studying at the Conservatoire de Paris, in 1849 Cahen won the second Grand Prix de Rome for composition (the first Grand Prix wasn't awarded that year). He worked at the Merklin organ of the Grand Synagogue of Paris and at the Cavaillé-Coll organ of the Synagogue de Nazareth.

Cahen composed several operettas, including Le Calfat (1858) and Le Souper de Mezzelin (1859), presented at the Théâtre des Folies-Nouvelles in Paris.

References 

French male classical composers
French operetta composers
Conservatoire de Paris alumni
Prix de Rome for composition
Musicians from Paris
French classical organists
French male organists
1828 births
1893 deaths
19th-century French male musicians
Male classical organists
19th-century organists